The Redonda ameiva (Pholidoscelis atratus) is a species of lizard found only on Redonda. It is sometimes described as a subspecies of the Montserrat ameiva (Pholidoscelis pluvianotatus, previously called Ameiva pluvianotata).

References

Pholidoscelis
Lizards of the Caribbean
Reptiles described in 1887
Taxa named by Samuel Garman
Endemic fauna of Antigua and Barbuda
Redonda